John James Maximilian Oertel (born at Ansbach, Bavaria, 27 April 1811; died at Jamaica, New York, 21 August 1882) was a German-American journalist.

Life

Oertel was in Ansbach as Lutheran; he was sent to the Lutheran University of Erlangen, where he studied theology and five years later was ordained a minister. After his ordination he accepted a call to care for his countrymen in the United States, and arrived in New York in October, 1837. The unorthodox opinions of the New York Lutherans displeased him, and he left for Missouri early in 1839. Things were no better there, so he returned to New York. Denominational dissensions weakened his faith, and in 1840 he became a Roman Catholic. An account of his conversion in pamphlet form published 25 March 1840, had quite a vogue in the controversial literature of the day.

After his conversion he taught German at St. John's College, Fordham; later he edited in Cincinnati the "Wahrheitsfreund", a German Catholic weekly, and in 1846 he left for Baltimore where he founded the weekly "Kirchenzeitung". Under his editorial direction, it was the most prominent German Catholic publication in the United States. In 1851, he moved the paper to New York. In 1869 he published "Altesund Neues".

In 1875 Pope Pius IX made him a Knight of St. Gregory in recognition of his service to the Church and Catholic literature.

References

Attribution
Catholic News (New York, 18 April 1908) The entry cites:
U.S. Cath. Hist. Soc., Hist. Records and Studies, IV, parts I and II (New York, Oct., 1906); 
John Gilmary Shea, The Cath. Church in. the U. S. (New York, 1856);

1811 births
1882 deaths
American editors
Converts to Roman Catholicism from Lutheranism
Converts to Roman Catholicism